The sixth season of Frasier aired from September 24, 1998, to May 20, 1999, on NBC, consisting of a total of 24 episodes. Beginning with this season, the show took over the time slot previously occupied by Seinfeld after Jerry Seinfeld turned down an offer to renew his show for a tenth season, allowing it to be on a Thursday night again since its move to a Tuesday night for seasons 2 through 5. It would continue to be on a Thursday night for the 7th season as well, before it was moved to Tuesday again with the 8th season.

Cast

Main
 Kelsey Grammer as Frasier Crane
 Jane Leeves as Daphne Moon
 David Hyde Pierce as Niles Crane
 Peri Gilpin as Roz Doyle
 Dan Butler as Bulldog
 John Mahoney as Martin Crane

Recurring 
 Edward Hibbert as Gil Chesterton
 Patrick Kerr as Noel Shempsky

Special guest
 Teri Hatcher as Marie
 Amy Brenneman as Faye
 Eva Marie Saint as Joanna Doyle
 Woody Harrelson as Woody Boyd
 Virginia Madsen as Cassandra Stone
 Saul Rubinek as Donny Douglas
 Christine Baranski as Dr. Nora Fairchild
 Piper Laurie as Mrs. Mulhern

Guest
 Tom McGowan as Kenny
 Timothy Omundson as Director
 Erika Christensen as Teenage Girl
 Fritz Weaver as Sir Trevor Ainsley
 Catherine Dent as Claudia Kynock
 Carole Shelley as Helen
 Trevor Einhorn as Frederick Crane
 Rosemary Murphy as Carol Larkin
 Mimi Hines as Mrs. Latimer
 Carolee Carmello as Jody
 Alice Playten as Bonnie
 Jason Graae as Jack
 Gregory Jbara as Bartender

Episodes

References

1998 American television seasons
1999 American television seasons
Frasier 06